TJR may refer to:

 TJR (DJ) (born 1983), American DJ
 Total joint replacement, or replacement arthroplasty, an orthopedic surgery procedure.
 The Jester Race, an album by melodic death metal band In Flames
 T. J. Roberts, Pakistan wildlife authority
 The ISO code for the Tajikistani rouble

See also
 Super Junior-T (슈퍼주니어-티), Korean boyband
 Junior technician